The Honda RC212V is a Japanese motorcycle created for road racing in the  MotoGP series. Officially introduced on 30 October 2006 as the RC211V replacement in the MotoGP series, it was developed by Honda Racing Corporation (HRC) throughout 2006 and began officially racing in the 2007 season.

The model name designates the following:
 RC= Honda's traditional racing prefix for 4-stroke bikes
 212= second works bike of the 21st century
 V= V engine

2007

Dani Pedrosa and Nicky Hayden rode the factory-backed versions, while the customer machines were ridden by Marco Melandri, Toni Elías, Carlos Checa, and Shinya Nakano. A perennial issue with Honda's GP motorcycle is which team and rider receives the best parts and whether performance differences are due to the rider not the machine. Before the racing season started in 2007, Melandri was quoted as saying, "In the past few tests I've seen a big progression with Pedrosa's bike, but we're still waiting for new parts from Honda."

After a few rounds, Honda riders did not achieve the results expected, leading HRC chief Satoru Horiike to admit that they made a mistake in the motorcycle's development. Melandri decided to ride with the Ducati team in 2008 and Pedrosa's dissatisfaction led to rumors that he was leaving Honda. Towards the end of 2007, however, there were signs of improvement, with the Repsol Honda team taking the last five pole positions of the season and Pedrosa winning the last round at Valencia.

2008

For 2008, HRC planned to use pneumatic valve springs and an all-new chassis. The mass centralization of the 2007 model was thought to have gone too far, and instead the 2008 model is more open, reducing heat and improving balance. The factory team riders are Pedrosa (through 2009) and Hayden (through 2008). Satellite team riders are Nakano, Andrea Dovizioso, Randy de Puniet and Alex de Angelis.

The 2008 pneumatic valve version has only been available to the Repsol Honda team, and in pre-season testing it has been highly problematic. The original intent of running an all-new engine and chassis was shelved when the engine did not perform to expectations. Pedrosa and Hayden then tested a 2007 engine in a 2008 chassis, and after still being near the bottom of testing timesheets, the Repsol Honda team used the 2007 version in the first round's practice for comparison purposes. For the race, Pedrosa chose a revised 2008 chassis while Hayden chose the 2007. The pneumatic engine was race-debuted by Hayden at the Donington round, and he was charged with developing the new engine for the rest of the season (Pedrosa deciding to continue using the conventional valve engine). An electronic problem at the subsequent Assen round caused Hayden to run out of fuel just before the line, allowing Colin Edwards to come around him and take the remaining podium position.

At the 13th round it was announced that Pedrosa would switch to Bridgestone tires for the remainder of the season, and he also planned to start racing the pneumatic valved engine in the 14th round at Indianapolis.

Unlike the other Honda teams, de Puniet's Team LCR used Öhlins suspension instead of Showa.

2009

For 2009, the factory team riders were Pedrosa and Dovizioso, and the satellite team riders were Elías, De Angelis, de Puniet and Yuki Takahashi; Elías was given a factory spec machine. The 2009 model was largely the same as the 2008. All 6 of the RC212Vs used pneumatic valve engines.

After two rounds the Repsol Honda riders had only achieved a single podium. Vice president of HRC, Shuhei Nakamoto, said "If Dani does not win the world championship it is Honda's responsibility, not Dani's," while Pedrosa said "I've spoken to (Nakamoto) but I've spoken to many people like him, but it seems like it's three years of the same story. What I really need is to see is some things coming, not always just hearing, talking, or a meeting. I'd like to have something where I can say okay, thank you, this is good."

Before Round 6 at Catalunya, Dovizioso expressed frustration that Pedrosa would be given priority in the post-race test, feeling that the Spaniard's poor physical condition would not lead to a productive evaluation. In the race, Dovizioso finished in 4th place and Pedrosa in 6th, and Pedrosa announced he would skip the test to rest. Using the new chassis, Dovizioso was top rider of the test.

In practice at Round 7 at Assen Pedrosa remarked that the new chassis was an improvement in braking and stability, but both Pedrosa and Dovizioso crashed in the race at the same turn. At the following round at Laguna Seca, Pedrosa won the race, while Dovizioso crashed out.

In post-race testing at Brno, the Repsol team tested Öhlins suspension components, which until then had been using Showa. For the San Marino round, Dovizioso will use Öhlins and Pedrosa will use Showa suspension.

The 2009 season ended with three wins for the Repsol Honda team—two for Pedrosa and one for Dovizioso—and a 2nd place in the constructor championship for Honda. At post-race testing at Valencia, Pedrosa tested Öhlins suspension exclusively, and the factory team tried a new chassis and swingarm. Pedrosa and Dovizioso had the 3rd and 6th fastest times over the three-day test.

2010
For 2010, the factory team riders are Pedrosa and Dovizioso, and the satellite team riders are Hiroshi Aoyama, de Puniet, Melandri and Marco Simoncelli. All riders are using Öhlins suspension components this year. The electronic systems were given an update, and the bike is shorter with a higher center of gravity. Also, Honda hired Andre Zugna and Cristian Battaglia, formerly Yamaha race engineers, and Carlo Luzzi, formerly Jorge Lorenzo’s telemetry technician at Yamaha.

According to one analysis of pre-season tests at Sepang and Qatar, Dovizioso's average placing in the tests was third, while Pedrosa's was ninth. Pedrosa complained of problems with the suspension and chassis, and at the first race of the season in Qatar, Dovizioso finished third, while Pedrosa finished in seventh place. Pedrosa experienced speed wobbles down the front straight, and Honda determined that they had committed a mistake in the design of the chassis, and that by trying to make the bike easier to ride, they made it too flexible.

By the following round at Jerez, Pedrosa had a new chassis and finished the race in second place and Dovizioso finished in sixth; in the test after the race, Pedrosa finished fastest and Dovizioso fifth, using a new swingarm that Pedrosa used in the race, and also a new chassis. Pedrosa later said and Honda confirmed that a fuel sensor problem slowed down the RC212V in the final laps and may have cost him the victory at Jerez.

At the third round at Le Mans, Dovizioso finished the race in third and Pedrosa in fifth, the latter getting passed in the last lap by Dovizioso and Hayden and later reporting problems with the rear brake. Melandri had switched back to Showa suspension and finished in sixth place. At the fourth round at Mugello, Pedrosa won the race, Dovizioso finished third and Melandri finished fifth. Pedrosa used a 2009 model rear shock. During first practice at the 14th round at Motegi, the throttle cable stuck and caused Pedrosa to crash and break his collarbone, causing him to miss the race and putting him out of contention for the championship. At the 16th round in Australia, Dovizioso's steering damper had a problem, forcing him to retire from the race. The season ended with Honda placing second in the MotoGP constructor championship with 342 points, 62 points behind first-place Yamaha and 56 points ahead of third-place Ducati.

2011
For 2011 the factory supported riders were Andrea Dovizioso, Dani Pedrosa, Casey Stoner, and Marco Simoncelli while the satellite supported riders were Hiroshi Aoyama and Toni Elías. Honda riders dominated pre-season testing. Frame geometry and rigidity are the same as the previous year, making the 2011 bike an evolution of the 2010 version. One of the improvements to the 2011 machine is a "seamless transmission". Stoner and Dovizioso chose to use the 2011 chassis, while Pedrosa decided to stay with the more flexible 2010 version.

After the third round at Estoril, Dovizioso began to use a new clutch designed to reduce hopping under braking.

Honda won the manufacturer's championship with 13 wins between Stoner's ten and Pedrosa's three, and never finished lower than second in race results. The factory RC212V was retired at the end of the season to make way for the 2012 RC213V, though leased models will still be raced by satellite teams.

Specifications

Summary MotoGP results

Titles Won
Riders:  (Casey Stoner)
Constructers: 

Races won: 26
2011: Stoner 10, Pedrosa 3 (13 in total) 
2010: Pedrosa 4 (4 in total) 
2009: Pedrosa 2, Dovizioso 1 (3 in total) 
2008: Pedrosa 2 (2 in total) 
2007: Pedrosa 2 (2 in total) 
2006: Pedrosa 2 (2 in total) 

Poles: 30
2011: Stoner 12, Pedrosa 3 (15 in total) 
2010: Pedrosa 4, Dovizioso 1 (5 in total) 
2009: Pedrosa 2 (2 in total) 
2008: Pedrosa 2 (2 in total) 
2007: Pedrosa 5, Hayden 1 (6 in total)

Complete MotoGP results 
(key) (results in bold indicate pole position; results in italics indicate fastest lap)
(the teams are bold indicate factory teams; the riders are bold indicate the rider rode a factory bikes in the satellite teams)

References

External links

 Honda MotoGP official site
 Honda Releases More Details On Their New 800cc MotoGP Contender article from Motorcycle Daily
 Honda Talks 2007 RC212V  article from Motorcycle USA
 Honda unveil 'RC212V' article from Crash.net
 Honda Unveils RC212V V4 800 article from SPEEDtv

RC212V
Grand Prix motorcycles
Motorcycles introduced in 2006